Peter Gilmour (born 25 January 1960) is an Australian sailing skipper. He is an America's Cup veteran and was named Western Australian Sportsman of the Year in 1987. He is also the only 4 time World Match racing Tour Champion. He currently resides in Perth, Western Australia.

Gilmour started sailing at the age of seven on Perth's Swan River, and he competed in his first world championship at the age of 16, finishing 21st. Gilmour's performance continued to improve as his experience with the different disciplines of sailing increased.

Gilmour has since been through four other America's Cup teams since the Kookaburra days, most recently with Ernesto Bertarelli's Alinghi Team winners of the 32nd America's Cup.

Peter Gilmour has sailed in everything from dinghies to offshore yachts, having competed in both the Sydney–Hobart and Fastnet races, but has settled on match-racing as his chosen field.

World Match Racing Tour 

Peter was the first repeat champion of the World Match Racing Tour. He won the 2003–'04 Swedish Match Tour championship with 150 points. He followed that up with a come-from-behind victory in 2004–'05. Peter trailed by 23 points beginning the second half of the season, but closed with a string of 2-1-1-1 to complete the comeback. He then went on to be crowned Tour Champion again in 2005 – '06.  Australian Peter Gilmour is one of the most respected and feared competitors on World Match Racing Tour. After all, he is a three-time World Champion of Match Race Sailing. But he's also one of the most knowledgeable skippers on the Tour.

That knowledge comes not only from years on the match-race circuit, but also five different syndicates for the America's Cup. Gilmour's Cup career began with the 1987 defense in Perth, Western Australia, when he was the starting helmsman for Kevin Parry's Kookaburra syndicate, which ultimately lost the America's Cup.

Gilmour, however, had made his mark. During the Australian trials to select the Cup defender, Gilmour used the racing rules to his advantage and drew countless protests on his rivals. The members of the International Jury often found themselves sorting out protests well past when everyone had left the media center. Sometimes their decisions overturned previous day's results, which created chaos with the defense trials.

Gilmour's actions would ultimately lead to the creation of the Match Racing Rules, an appendix to the Racing Rules of Sailing. The goal of the new rules was to decide on-the-water infractions immediately through umpires in chase boats or on the competing boats.

Mr Gilmour was also inducted as the 2009 Chairman of the  World Yacht Racing Forum.

Peter Gilmour in match racing 

World match racing tour results
2009 – 4th Overall
2008  – 8th Overall
2006–07 – 5th Overall
2005–06 – 1st Tour Champion
2004–05 – 1st Tour Champion
2003–04 – 1st Tour Champion
2000–01 – 6th Overall
2000 – 4th Overall

2010
10th – Stena Match Cup Sweden '10
(Crew: Kazuhiko Sofuku, Cameron Dunn, Yasuhiro Yaji, Thierry Douillard)
1st – Portimão Portugal Match Cup '10
(Crew: Kazuhiko Sofuku, Cameron Dunn, Yasuhiro Yaji, Thierry Douillard)
5th – Korea Match Cup '10
(Crew: Martin Berntson, Cameron Dunn, Yasuhiro Yaji, Thierry Douillard)
6th – Match Race Germany '10
(Crew: Martin Berntson, Nils Bjerkäs, Yasuhiro Yaji, Cristian Pontin)
11th – Match Race France '10
(Crew: Thierry Douillard, Yashuri Yaji, David Gilmour)

2009
3rd – Match Race Germany
6th – Korea Match Cup
6th – Troia Portugal Match Cup
1st – Match Cup Sweden
7th – St Moritz Match Race
3rd – Danish Open
3rd – Monsoon Cup

2008
1st  – Monsoon Cup '08
(Crew:  Kazuhiko Sofuku, Thierry Douliard, Yasuhiro Yaji, Rod Dawson)
5th – Match Cup Sweden '08
(Crew: Johnnie Berntson, Thierry Douliard, Yasuhiro Yaji, Nick Blackman)
9th – Korea Match Cup '08
(Crew: Yasuhiro Yaji, Thierry Douillard, Tim Castles, Mark O'Toole)

2006–'07
2nd – Monsoon Cup '07
(Crew: Rod Dawson, Kazuhiko Sofuku, Yasuhiro Yaji, Christian Scherrer)
9th – Latium Match Cup '07
(Crew: Rod Dawson, Kazuhiko Sofuku, Yasuhiro Yaji, Zach Murst)
1st – Troia Portugal Match Cup
(Crew: Rod Dawson, Kazuhiko Sofuku, Yasuhiro Yaji, Zach Murst)
4th – Monsoon Cup '06
(Crew: Rick Brent, Christian Scherrer, Graeme Spence, Yasuhiro Yaji)
6th – Allianz Cup '06
(Crew: Bill Colombo, Keith Love, Sean Svendsen, Yasuhiro Yaji)
9th – St. Moritz Match Race '06
(Crew: David Gilmour, Graeme Spence)
3rd – Portugal Match Cup '06
(Crew: Rod Dawson, Christian Scherrer, Ed Smyth, Yasuhiro Yaji)

2005–'06
1st – Monsoon Cup '05
(Crew: Rod Dawson, Kazuhiko Sofuku, Yasuhiro Yaji, Tatsuya Wakinaga)
1st – Match Race Germany '06
(Crew: Rod Dawson, Jan Reblin, Christian Scherrer, Yasuhiro Yaji)
3rd – PTPortugal Match Cup '05
(Crew: Frederico Cerveira, Thierry Fouchier, Fred Guilmin, Yasuhiro Yaji)
3rd – ACI Match Race Cup '06
(Crew: Rod Dawson, Thierry Douillard, Kazuhiko Sofuku, Yasuhiro Yaji)
6th – St. Moritz Match Race '05
(Crew: Teague Czislowski, David Gilmour)

2004–'05
1st – Swedish Match Cup '05
(Crew: Rod Dawson, Mike Mottl, Kazuhiko Sofuku, Yasuhiro Yaji)
1st – ACI H1 Match Race Cup '05
(Crew: Rod Dawson, Mike Mottl, Kazuhiko Sofuku, Yasuhiro Yaji)
1st – Match Race Germany '05
(Crew: Rod Dawson, Mike Mottl, Kazuhiko Sofuku, Yasuhiro Yaji)
2nd – Toscana Elba Cup – Trofeo Locman '05
(Crew: Rod Dawson, Mike Mottl, Kazuhiko Sofuku, Yasuhiro Yaji)
4th – Nippon Cup '04
(Crew: Mike Mottl, Kazuhiko Sofuku, Yasuhiro Yaji)
5th – Portugal Match Cup '04
(Crew: Rod Dawson, Mike Mottl, Kazuhiko Sofuku, Yasuhiro Yaji)
5th – Danish Open '04
(Crew: Rod Dawson, Mike Mottl, Alan Smith, Yasuhiro Yaji)
5th – King Edward VII Gold Cup '04
(Crew: Mike Mottl, Kazuhiko Sofuku, Yasuhiro Yaji)

2003–'04
1st – Investors Guaranty Presentation of the King Edward VII Gold Cup '03
1st – Nippon Cup '03
1st – Match Race Germany '04
2nd – Swedish Match Cup '04
2nd – Toscana Elba Cup – Trofeo Locman '04
2nd – ACI HTmobile Cup '04
3rd – Danish Open '03
4th – Congressional Cup '04

2002–'03
4th – UBS Challenge '02
7th – Swedish Match Cup '03

2000–'01
1st – Sun Microsystems Australia Cup '01
5th – Trofeo Challenge Roberto Trombini '00
5th – Colorcraft Gold Cup '00
11th – Swedish Match Cup '01

2000
2nd – ACI Cup/World Championship of Match Racing '00
5th – Trofeo Challenge Roberto Trombini '00
5th – Colorcraft Gold Cup '00
6th – Swedish Match Cup '00
8th – Sun Microsystems Australia Cup '00
8th – Match Race Germany '00

America's Cup Affiliation
Alinghi – Coach, America's Cup Winner 2007
OneWorld Challenge – Skipper, 3rd place Louis Vuitton Cup 2003
Nippon Challenge – Skipper, 4th place Louis Vuitton Cup 2000
Nippon Challenge – Coach, 4th place Louis Vuitton Cup 1995
Spirit of Australia – Helmsman, 6th place Louis Vuitton Cup 1992
Kookaburra Syndicate – Helmsman, lost America's Cup to Dennis Conner's Stars & Stripes

References 

Living people
1960 births
1987 America's Cup sailors
1992 America's Cup sailors
1995 America's Cup sailors
2000 America's Cup sailors
2003 America's Cup sailors
2007 America's Cup sailors
Alinghi sailors
Australian Champions Soling
Australian male sailors (sport)